Ho Jong-suk (July 16, 1908 – June 5, 1991) was a prominent female figure in the Communist Party of Korea and sexual liberation of Korea under Japanese rule. From 1948, she served multiple offices in North Korea, including the Minister of Health and Chief Justice of the Supreme Court of North Korea.

Life 

She was born as Ho Jongja (허정자; 許貞子)., the daughter of Ho Hon.
In her early years, Ho went to Japan to study in Kwansei School in Tokyo. She later left and in her next years Ho went to the Shanghai International Settlement of Republic of China where she was given an entrance to Shanghai Foreign High School where she graduated. Later she returned to her country. In 1921, she participated in the women Movement and joined Korean Communist Party.

At that time, Japanese Government-General of Korea decided to make the Communist Party illegal. She avoided persecution for participation in the Communist Party. Later in 1924, she was introduced to International Women's Day, in March 1925, she went to Women's Day event in Seoul.

Ho also was in favor of "Unrelated Love and Sex". Her opinion was denounced in Korean society because at that time, the vestiges of fundamentalist Confucianism remained in the Koreas.

In 1936, she went to China where she participated in the Korean National Revolutionary Party (조선민족혁명당). In 1945, she went to Seoul but she left for North Korea to avoid right-wing terrorism. In 1948 she participated in the North Korean government. She served as Minister of Culture in 1948-1957, and Minister of Justice in 1957. 

Ho served as the Chief Justice of the Supreme Court of North Korea between 28 October 1959 and 1960.

Bibliography 
 In Grace Lover (은혜로운 사랑 속에서)
 Democraticism founder days (민주건국의 나날에)
 Historical rememories of great loves (위대한 사랑의 력사를 되새기며)

See also 
 Hwang Jini
 Heo Nanseolheon
 Na Hye-sok
 Shin Saimdang

References

External links 

 Ho Jong-suk:britannica 
 Ho Jong-suk 
 Ho Jong-suk 
 Ho Jong-suk 
 Ho Jong-suk 
 조선의 첫 녀성상 

1908 births
1991 deaths
Korean revolutionaries
Korean communists
Korean Marxists
Korean women philosophers
Korean writers
Korean educators
Korean scholars
20th-century Korean women
Kim Kyu-sik
Kim Won-bong
North Korean atheists
20th-century North Korean women politicians
20th-century North Korean politicians
Anti-Japanese sentiment in Korea
Korean independence activists
Korean journalists
20th-century Korean philosophers
Women chief justices
North Korean judges
Korean women judges
Socialist feminists
20th-century journalists
Members of the 1st Supreme People's Assembly
Members of the 2nd Supreme People's Assembly
Government ministers of North Korea
Women government ministers of North Korea